Cabrito is the name in both Spanish and Portuguese for roast goat kid in various Iberian and Latin American cuisines.

Argentina
Cabrito is also a regional specialty of Córdoba Province in Argentina, especially the town of Quilino, which has a festival in its honour. "Chivito" differs from "cabrito" in that chivito is a slightly older animal with less tender meat. The chivito has already begun to eat solid foods, whereas the cabrito is still a suckling.

Mexico
It is a regional specialty of the city of Monterrey, Mexico, and the surrounding state of Nuevo Leon, based on the Jewish cuisine of the founders of the city.

In northern Mexico, cabrito is cooked in a variety of ways:

 Cabrito al pastor: The best-known and perhaps most popular form. The whole carcass is opened flat and impaled on a spit. The spit is then placed next to a bed of glowing embers and roasted slowly in the open air without seasonings other than the light scent it will absorb from the slow-burning charcoal.
 Cabrito al horno (oven-roasted cabrito): Toasted slowly in an oven at low temperatures. A number of variants of this preparation have emerged, including some very elaborate processes that involve applying seasonings and covering the cooking meat at specific times to produce a tasty and juicy treat.
 Cabrito en salsa (cabrito in sauce): The animal is cut into portions, browned in oil and braised in a tomato-based sauce with onions, garlic and green chilies, and other seasonings until tender.
 Cabrito en sangre (cabrito in blood), sometimes fritada de cabrito: A less common preparation in which the blood of the animal is collected when it is slaughtered and it becomes the basis for the sauce that the goat is braised in, along with the animal's liver, kidneys, and heart, and other seasonings. The end product is tender cabrito in a rich, very dark sauce.

Portugal and Brazil
In Portuguese, the name cabrito is used for a goat kid (not just roasted) in Northeast Region, Brazil, especially in the Sertão Nordestino and in Portugal. The goat being about 3 months old is slow-cooked over a charcoal fire for about eight hours, turning it every 15-20 minutes.

See also

 List of goat dishes
 List of Mexican dishes

References

Argentine cuisine
Brazilian cuisine
Goat dishes
Meat
Mexican cuisine